Princelett, sometimes spelled "Princelet", is a hamlet on the Isle of Wight. Princelett is in Newchurch parish. Until the mid 20th Century it was known chiefly for its milk distribution business known as Princelett Dairy.

References

Hamlets on the Isle of Wight